Paroxysmal supraventricular tachycardia (PSVT) is a type of supraventricular tachycardia, named for its intermittent episodes of abrupt onset and termination. Often people have no symptoms. Otherwise symptoms may include palpitations, increased heart rate, feeling lightheaded, sweating, shortness of breath, and chest pain.

The cause is not known. Risk factors include alcohol, caffeine, nicotine, psychological stress, and Wolff-Parkinson-White syndrome, which often is inherited. The underlying mechanism typically involves an accessory pathway that results in re-entry. Diagnosis is typically by an electrocardiogram (ECG) which shows narrow QRS complexes and a fast heart rhythm typically between 150 and 240 beats per minute.

Vagal maneuvers, such as the Valsalva maneuver, are often used as the initial treatment. If not effective and the person has a normal blood pressure the medication adenosine may be tried. If adenosine is not effective a calcium channel blocker or beta blocker may be used. Otherwise synchronized cardioversion is the treatment. Future episodes can be prevented by catheter ablation.

About 2.3 per 1000 people have paroxysmal supraventricular tachycardia. Problems typically begin in those 12 to 45  years old. Women are more often affected than men. Outcomes are generally good in those who otherwise have a normal heart. An ultrasound of the heart may be done to rule out underlying heart problems.

Signs and symptoms
Symptoms may include palpitations, feeling faint, sweating, shortness of breath, and chest pain. Episodes start and end suddenly.

Types
 AV nodal re-entrant tachycardia (AVNRT) makes up 56% of cases
 Atrioventricular reentrant tachycardia (AVRT) makes up 27% of cases
 Wolff-Parkinson-White syndrome
 Paroxysmal atrial tachycardia makes up 17% of cases

Treatment
AV nodal blocking can be achieved in at least three ways:

Physical maneuvers
A number of physical maneuvers increase the resistance of the AV node to transmit impulses (AV nodal block), principally through activation of the parasympathetic nervous system, conducted to the heart by the vagus nerve. These manipulations are collectively referred to as vagal maneuvers.

The Valsalva maneuver should be the first vagal maneuver tried and works by increasing intra-thoracic pressure and affecting baroreceptors (pressure sensors) within the arch of the aorta. It is carried out by asking the patient to hold his/her breath while trying to exhale forcibly as if straining during a bowel movement. Holding the nose and exhaling against the obstruction has a similar effect.
Pressing down gently on the top of closed eyes may also bring heartbeat back to normal rhythm for some people with atrial or supraventricular tachycardia (SVT). This is known as the oculocardiac reflex.

Medications

Adenosine, an ultra-short-acting AV nodal blocking agent, is indicated if vagal maneuvers are not effective. If unsuccessful or the PSVT recurs diltiazem or verapamil are recommended. Adenosine may be safely used during pregnancy.

SVT that does not involve the AV node may respond to other anti-arrhythmic drugs such as sotalol or amiodarone.

Cardioversion
If the person is hemodynamically unstable or other treatments have not been effective, synchronized electrical cardioversion may be used. In children this is often done with a dose of 0.5 to 1 J/Kg.

References

External links 

Wikipedia medicine articles ready to translate
Cardiac arrhythmia
Wikipedia emergency medicine articles ready to translate